Songs of Moors and Misty Fields (1997) is the second album by the German band Empyrium.

Elaborating on their previous full-length album, A Wintersunset... released a year before, with Songs of Moors... Empyrium delve into a more sophisticated intricacy of what is sometimes called "romantic metal", offering a complicated mix of percussion, flutes, bass guitars and synths, together with its will-be trademark deep baritone male vocals performed by Schwadorf himself (who also plays virtually all the instrument parties, except for keyboards).

The band's following two albums, Where at Night the Wood Grouse Plays (1999) and Weiland (2002), are purely acoustic.

Track listing

Personnel
 Ulf Theodor Schwadorf - vocals, drums, guitars, bass, photography
 Nadine Mölter - cello, flute, photography
 Andreas Bach - synthesizer

Additional personnel
 Andreas Beck - engineering
 Jürgen Holzhausen - cover art, photography
 Martin Koller - executive producer
 Timo Ketola - digipack logo

External links
 Album reviews:
 Encyclopedia Metallum
 CoC
 Rate Your Music

1997 albums
Empyrium albums